Martyn Griffiths (born 18 April 1946) is a British racing driver, whose greatest success has been in hillclimbing. He has won the British Hill Climb Championship on five occasions (1979, 1986, 1987, 1990, 1991).

References

British hillclimb drivers
Living people
1946 births